The Cosmopolitan Hotel and Restaurant in the Old Town San Diego State Historic Park is a registered national historic landmark, built in the early 19th century by Juan Bandini and later purchased by Albert Seeley to serve as a stagecoach hotel. In 2010, restorations and added fine dining restaurant revived the hotel to its 1870s charm, making it again a focal point of the original downtown area.

History
The Cosmopolitan Hotel and Restaurant was originally built between 1827 and 1829 as a one floor Spanish colonial style home for cattle rancher Don Juan Bandini. In the 1850s Bandini sold his home, and by 1869 it was restored and extended with a second floor into a stagecoach stop and hotel under the direction of Albert Seeley.

Seeley a stage master, converted the old adobe into an L-shaped Greek Revival hotel. He renovated the original first story, and added a wood framed second story and balconies. The hotel prospered as a stagecoach stop offering 20 rooms for a layover between Los Angeles and San Diego. By 1888, Seeley sold the hotel due to a major shift in railroad use and a rising downtown Gaslamp Quarter. In the following years it was used as an olive factory.

"The Miramar"
In 1928 Don Juan Bandini's grandson, Cave J. Couts Jr., son of Lieutenant Cave J. Couts, bought the property in order to restore it as a memorial to his mother Ysidora Bandini de Couts. Couts remodeled the residence in Steamboat Revival architecture style. By 1930 the building was wired for electricity, and gas. Cave J. Couts Jr. renames the building as, "The Miramar," hotel and restaurant.

The Miramar is sold to the State of California
In 1945 James H. and Nora Cardwell purchased the Bandini property. During the 1950s their son Frank renovated the building into an upscale tourist motel. The Cardwells eventually sold the property to the state of California in 1968, the same year Old Town became a state historic park. The State of California and concessionaire Chef and restaurant owner Joseph Melluso came to an operating agreement. Under agreement the Hotel would receive necessary historical excavation, and restoration to the time period of the Cosmopolitan Hotel.

Reopening
The Cosmopolitan reopened for business as a Hotel and Restaurant July 21, 2010 after massive restorations to revitalize it to its 1870s grandeur. By August 2011 Owner Joseph Melluso had sold a majority of ownership over to Catherine Miller. In July 2013, the Cosmo was taken over by Old Town Family Hospitality Corp. Owner and President Chuck Ross, who also operates two restaurants in Old Town San Diego State Historic Park – Casa de Reyes and Barra Barra Saloon.

Original features
Don Juan Bandini built his single story, thatched roof adobe between 1827 and 1829 on Old Town, San Diego plaza's southeast corner. The original structure had seven rooms, an entrance-way, and enclosed courtyard, a corral, and several sheds. The Casa de Juan Bandini had features of Spanish Colonial architecture usually found only in California missions. During the 1840s, he added several enhancements such as pane-glass windows, a brick-lined patio with well, and a small, bathhouse to entice his daughters to visit his wife Refugio and him more frequently.

Hauntings
The Cosmopolitan Hotel is reportedly haunted with multiple friendly spirits in its guestrooms, including a cat who roams, Ysidora Bandini's ghost (daughter of original proprietor) in room 11 and the spirit of a Lady in Red in room 4/5, to name a few.

The Cosmopolitan Hotel was featured on Episode 56 of Ghost Adventures which aired October 7, 2011.

Further reading

See also

History of San Diego

References

External links

 
 Official Old Town San Diego State Historic Park website
 Cosmopolitan Hotel & Restaurant / La Casa de Bandini Restoration
 1930s Balustrade Uncovered

American West museums in California
History of San Diego
Houses in San Diego
National Register of Historic Places in San Diego
The Californias
Mexican California
Buildings and structures in San Diego
Historic district contributing properties in California
Houses on the National Register of Historic Places in California
Reportedly haunted locations in California